Nikola Altomanović (died after 1395) was a 14th-century Serbian župan of the House of Vojinović. He ruled the areas from Rudnik, over Polimlje, Podrinje, east Herzegovina with Trebinje, reaching as far as  Konavle and Dračevica, neighboring the Republic of Dubrovnik. He was defeated and blinded in Užice (fortress Užice) in 1373 by a coalition of his Serbian and Bosnian royals neighbors supported by the king of Hungary.

Biography

His father was Altoman Vojinović, a vojvod in Zeta. In 1363, Nikola's uncle Vojislav Vojinović was killed and Nikola used his uncle's death to gain a piece of his land. He allied himself with Lazar Hrebeljanović against King Vukašin Mrnjavčević and they managed to persuade Uroš to support them. However, after Lazar pulled out at the critical moment they were defeated at Kosovo in 1369.

In 1373, a military alliance against Nikola was created, which included Bosnian Ban Tvrtko I Kotromanić, Zetan Ruler Đurađ I Balšić, Mačvan Prince Nikola Gorjanski, and Hungarian King Ludovik I. In the same year, they battled against Nikola and Nikola lost, thus his territory was split between Prince Lazar Hrebeljanović of Serbia, Đurađ I Balšić of Zeta, and Ban Tvrtko I Kotromanić of Bosnia.

In fall of 1373, after the Serbian defeat against the Ottomans at the Battle of Maritsa he partitioned some lands with Lazar of Serbia.

Last time he was mentioned as still alive in 1395.

References

Sources

External links
Istorijska biblioteka: Nikola Altomanović (in Serbian)

14th-century Serbian nobility
Vojinović noble family
People of the Serbian Empire
Year of birth missing
Year of death missing
Medieval Serbian military leaders
Medieval Serbian magnates
14th-century soldiers